VNS Matrix was an artist collective founded in Adelaide, Australia, in 1991, by Josephine Starrs, Julianne Pierce, Francesca da Rimini and Virginia Barratt. Their work included installations, events, and posters distributed through the Internet, magazines, and billboards. Taking their point of departure in a sexualised and socially provocative relationship between women and technology the works subversively questioned discourses of domination and control in the expanding cyber space. They are credited as being amongst the first artists to use the term cyberfeminism to describe their practice.

Background 

VNS Matrix was an Australian feminist artist group who were active from 1991 to 1997. Their activist practice was concerned primarily with women's role in technology and art, specifically taking issue with "the gendered dominance and control of the new technologies" and exploring, "the construction of social space, identity and sexuality in cyberspace"

One of their first works was a 6 by 18 foot billboard announcing "the clitoris is a direct line to the matrix...". In 1991, they wrote their "A Cyberfeminist Manifesto for the 21st Century." Though the manifesto was designed for the Internet—reposted to various websites—it also piratically circulated through traditional media, including radio broadcast, television, posted in public spaces and placed in the printed advertisements of magazines.

In 1993 VNS Matrix debuted their computer art game/installation All New Gen at the Experimental Art Foundation Gallery in Adelaide which received national interest, critical acclaim, and wildly enthusiastic reviews.

After logging on to All New Gen, the first question asked of game players is: 'What is your gender? Male, Female, Neither.' 'Neither' is the correct answer, since clicking the Male or Female icon sends players spinning on a loop that takes them out of the game. In 1994 All New Gen was well received at the International Symposium on Electronic Art in Helsinki after which it toured to a number of galleries and art spaces in Australia, Europe, the United States, Canada and Japan. VNS Matrix was later awarded a $100,000 grant from the Australian Film Commission to develop a prototype of an All Gen CD-ROM game for international distribution called Bad Code, which included a number of enhancements including sophisticated new images, 3D graphic spaces, animations, video sequences, characters and zones.

Recent Work 
In 2019, VNS Matrix participated in the group show Producing Futures: An Exhibition on Post-Cyberfeminism at the Migros Museum für Gegenwartskunst in Zurich, Switzerland.

See also
 Art manifesto
Cyberfeminism
 Australian Feminist Art Timeline

References

Further reading
VNS Matrix and Virginia Barratt interviewed by Bernadette Flynn. Continuum: Journal of Media and Cultural Studies 8(1): 1994, pp. 419–432.
 An Oral History of the First Cyberfeminists by Claire L. Evans Motherboard, Dec 11th 2014. Retrieved 4.2.2014

External links 
 Transmediale archive 
 VNS Matrix bio on Media Art Net
 Cyberfeminist Manifesto for the 21st Century
 Virginia Barratt on academia.edu
 Josephine Starrs website
 Mention in Wired Magazine Article on Cyborgs and Donna Haraway
 Vice Motherboard Article
 "A Cyberfeminist Manifesto for the 21st Century" at Rhizome's Net Art Anthology

Australian digital artists
Australian feminists
Australian conceptual artists
Australian contemporary artists
Postmodern artists
Postmodern feminists
New media art